The Tapoa River is a tributary of the Niger River. It flows through the Tapoa Province in Burkina Faso and forms a small part of the international border between Burkina Faso and Niger, after which it flows into the Niger River in southwestern Niger.

Rivers of Burkina Faso
Rivers of Niger
Tributaries of the Niger River
Burkina Faso–Niger border
International rivers of Africa